The Dame du Palais, originally only Dame, was an historical office in the Royal Court of France. It was a title of a lady-in-waiting holding the official position of personal attendant on a female member of the French Royal Family. The position was traditionally held by a female member of a noble family. They were ranked between the Première dame d'honneur and the Fille d'honneur. They had previously been styled 'Dames'.

The equivalent title and office has historically been used in most European royal courts (Dutch: Dames du Palais; English: Lady of the Bedchamber; German: Hofstaatsdame or Palatsdame; Italian: Dame di Corte; Russian: Hofdame or Statsdame; Spanish: Dueña de honor; Swedish: Statsfru). The same title has been used for the equivalent position in the courts of Belgium, Greece and The Netherlands.

History

Dame and Dame d'honneur 

Initially, the married ladies-in-waiting who attended the queen of France had the title Dame. This was simply the title of a married lady-in-waiting, who was not the principal lady-in-waiting.

From 1523, the group of 'Dame', (married) ladies-in-waiting who attended the court as companions of the queen had the formal title Dame d'honneur ('Lady of Honour', commonly only 'Dame'), hence the title 'Première dame d'honneur' ('First lady of honour') to distinguish between the principal lady-in-waiting and the group of remaining common (married) ladies-in-waiting.  They were third in rank below the Dame d'atours, and above the unmarried Fille d'honneur ('maid of honour').

Dame du Palais

In 1674, the position of Fille d'honneur was abolished, and the 'Dames' were renamed Dame du Palais.

The Dame du Palais were appointed from the highest ranked nobility of France. Only married women were selected. Their task was function as companions to the queen and attend functions as a part of her entourage. The number were in 1674 set at twelve.

The position was abolished with the introduction of the Republic in 1792. It was revived during the First Empire, with the same original position as the title of a married lady-in-waiting below the 'Première dame d'honneur'.  It was last used during the Second Empire.

List of Dame du Palais to the Queens and Empresses of France

This is an incomplete list of those who have served as Dame du Palais to the Queen or Empress of France. They also include those prior to 1674, who had the title Dame (formally Dame d'honneur), because it was the same position under different names. The office was normally shared between twelve women, who served in parallel. If additional Dame du Palais was appointed above the number twelve, they were normally named Dame du palais surnuméraire.

Dame (-d'honneur) to Eleanor of Austria 1532–1547

 1532-1534 : Hélène Gouffier de Boisy, dame de Traves
 1532-1537 : Isabeau de Picart d'Estelan, dame du Ris
 1532-1542 : Marie Gaudin
 1532-1543 : Marie d'Acigné, dame de Canaples
 1532-1543 : Jacqueline de la Queille, dame d'Aubigny
 1532-1543 : Anne Lascaris
 1532-1543 : Françoise de Longwy 
 1532-1543 : Diane de Poitiers
 1532-1543 : Isabelle de Savoie-Villars, comtesse du Bouchage
 1532-1543, 1546-1547 : Louise de Polignac, dame du Vigean
 1533-1543 : Madeleine de Mailly, dame de Roye
 1534-1537 : Anne de La Fontaine, dame de la Mairie (fille d'honneur 1532 - 1534)
 1534-1542 and 1545-1547 : Marie de Langeac, baronne de Lestrange 
 1537-1543 : Claude de Rohan-Gié (fille d'honneur de 1530 à 1537)
 1537-1543 : Marguerite de Savoie-Villars, comtesse de Brienne (fille d'honneur 1533 - 1537)
 ?-1538 : Jeanne d'Angoulême 
 1538-1539 : Françoise de Brézé (fille d'honneur 1534 - 1538)
 1538-1543 : Jacqueline de Longwy (fille d'honneur 1533 - 1538)
 1538-1543 : Jacqueline de Rohan-Gyé (fille d'honneur 1531 - 1536)
 1539-1543 : Charlotte de Brie, dame de Lauzun
 1539-1543 : Guillemette de Sarrebruck
 1540-? : Françoise Girard de Chevenon, dame de la Trollière
 1543-? : Jacqueline de Romezolles, dame de Castillon
 ?-1543 : Madeleine de Savoie
 1546-1547 : Guyonne de Rieux (fille d'honneur 1533-1543)
 Anne de Pisseleu d'Heilly

Dame (-d'honneur) to Catherine de' Medici 1547–1589

 1544-1547, 1560-1570 : Marie-Catherine Pierrevive
 1548-1560 : Anne de Clermont, dame de Saint-Aignan
 ?-1548 : Claude d'Humières
 1549-? : Marguerite d'Albon, dame d'Apchon
 1549-? : Jacqueline de l'Hospital, dame d'Aisnay
 1549-1560 : Antoinette de Cerisay 
 ?-1549 : Françoise de Pompadour, dame de Lustrac
 1551-1574 : Marie de Bony, dame d'Ausances
 ?-1552 : Madeleine Buonaiuti
 1552-? : Louise de Clermont
 1552-? : Hélène de Bissipat, dame de Jamets
 1552-1555, 1573-1585 : Éléonore Stuart d'Albany, comtesse de Choisy 
 1552-1560 : Louise de Brézé
 1552-1560, 1568-1574 et 1576-? : Anne d'Este
 1552-1560, 1573-? : Charlotte de Vienne, dame de Curton
 1554-1560 : Antoinette de Bourbon
 1554-1560 : Renée du Quesnay, dame de Moncy
 1554-1560, 1567-1571 et 1573-1575 : Jeanne de Dampierre
 ?-1554 : Claude de Saint-Seigne, dame de Dampierre
 1557-1560, 1560-1571 et 1576-1581 : Diane de Valois 
 ?-1560 : Marguerite de Lustrac, maréchale de Saint-André
 ?-1560 : Diane de Poitiers
 ?-1560 : Guillemette de Sarrebruck
 ?-1560, 1564-1568 : Hillaire de Marconnay, dame de la Berlandière
 1560-1564 : Françoise de Longwy
 1560-1566 : Claude Gouffier, comtesse de Charny
 1560-1567 : Clarice Strozzi, comtesse de Tende (fille d'honneur 1554 - 1560)
 1560-1570 : Françoise de Brézé (Première dame d'honneur 1547 - 1559)
 1560-1571, 1576-1581 : Françoise Robertet, dame de Rostaing et de la Bourdaisière
 1564-? : Françoise de Warty, dame de Pequigny
 1564-1571 : Anne de Montpensier, duchesse de Nevers
 1564-1571 : Louise de Montberon, dame de Sansac
 1564-1571, 1576-? : Diane de Clermont, dame de Montlaur
 1564-1574 : Marie Morin (spouse of Michel de l'Hospital)
 1564-1576, 1581-? : Louise d'Avaugour, baronne de Clermont-Lodève
 1564-1583 : Louise d'Halluin, dame de Cipierre
 1565-1571 : Henriette de Nevers (1542-1601)
 1566-1569, 1573-1574 : Françoise d'Orléans (1549-1601)
 1567-? : Claude Catherine de Clermont
 1567-? : Gabrielle de Rochechouart, dame de Lansac
 1567-1571 : Antoinette de La Marck, maréchale de Damville puis duchesse de Montmorency (fille d'honneur 1560)
 1567-1571, 1573-1574 et 1576-1577 : Charlotte Picart d'Esquetot, maréchale de Brissac
 1567-1571, 1576-? : Marguerite de Conan, dame d'Acerac
 1567-1574, 1583 : Madeleine de Luxembourg, dame de Royan puis de La Chapelle aux Ursins (fille d'honneur 1560 - 1564)
 1567-1580 : Jeanne d'Halluin (fille d'honneur 1547 - 1557)
 1568-1569 : Laudamine de Médicis, maréchale de Strozzi
 1568-1569, 1573-1578 : Antoinette de La Tour-Landry, duchesse de Rouannois
 1569-?, 1573-1574 et 1578-? : Françoise de la Baume, maréchale de Tavannes
 1569-1571 : Catherine de Clèves
 1569-1574, 1577-1581 : Charlotte de Sauve
 ?-1570 : Madeleine de Savoie
 1571-1578 : Hélène Bon, dame de la Tour
 1572-? : Anne Cabrianne, dame de Lignerolles
 1573-? : Claude Gontault, dame de Saint-Sulpice
 1573-? : Marie de L'Aubépine, dame de Pinart
 1573-? : Claude de la Tour, dame de Tournon
 1573-?, 1583-? : Claude Robertet, dame des Arpentis
 1573-1574, 1585-? : Marie de La Chastre, dame de l'Aubépine
 1573-1576 : Françoise de Ramefort, dame de Boisbenest
 1573-1576, 1585-? : Louise Jay, vicomtesse de la Guerche
 1573-1589 : Madeleine de L'Aubépine
 1574-? : Marie Porret, dame de la Guesle
 1574-1577 : Anne de Pisseleu, baronne de Lucé 
 1574-1578 : Nicole le Roy sénéchale d'Agenois puis maréchale de Cossé
 1576-? : Jeanne de Gontaut
 1576-? : Lucrèce Cavalcanti, générale d'Elbenne
 1576-? : Renée de Coesmes, baronne d'Avaugour
 1576-? : Françoise d'O, dame de Maintenon
 1576-? : Gabrielle de Sado, vicomtesse de Tours
 1576-? : Anne de Thou, dame de Cheverny
 1576-1578 : Françoise de Rye, comtesse de Charny
 1576-1578, 1583-? : Françoise de Maridor, dame de Lucé
 1576-1583 : Claude de Pierres, dame de Marigny
 1577-? : Renée de Cossé-Brissac, dame de Mery
 1577-? : Jeanne de Gaignon, dame de Chadieu
 1578-? : Charlotte de Chabannes, dame de Moÿ
 1578-1584 : Claude de L'Aubépine, dame de Chemerault
 1578-? : Claude d'Ognies, dame d'Applaincourt
 1578-? : Marguerite de Rostaing, dame de Cousan
 1578-? : Anne de Warty, dame de Sénarpont
 ?-1578, 1581-? : Madeleine d'Ognies, dame de Castelpers
 1579-? : Anne de Carnazet, dame de Crèvecœur
 1579-? : Jeanne des Essars, dame de Cigogne
 1579-? : Madeleine le Roy, dame de Rouville
 1579-? : Jeanne de Moy, comtesse de Chateauvillain
 1581-? : Marie II de Saint-Pol
 1581-? : Renée d'Anjou-Mézière
 1581-? : Madeleine de Cossé-Brissac, comtesse puis marquise de Choisy
 1581-? : Renée du Prat, marquise de Curton
 1581-? : Laure de Saint Martin, dame de Biragues
 1581-1582 : Henriette de Savoie-Villars
 1582-1586 : Filippa Duci
 1583-? : Jeanne de Coesme
 1583-? : Diane de La Marck
 1583-? : Marguerite de La Chastre, dame de Saint-Nectaire
 1583-? : Julienne d'Arquenay, dame de Rambouillet
 1583-? : Hélène de Clermont, dame de Gramont
 1583-? : Charlotte des Ursins, marquise de Mosny
 1584-? : Charlotte de Moÿ, dame d'Esneval
 1585-? : Marie de Moy, dame de la Gruthuse
 1585-? : Anne de Barbanson, dame de Nantouillet
 1585-? : Anne Chabot, dame de Piennes
 1585-? : Anne Hurault, dame de Bury
 1585-? : Catherine de Marcilly, dame de Ragny
 1585-? : Anne Robertet, dame de la Chastre
 1585-? : Charlotte de Villequier, dame d'O
 Jacqueline de Rohan, Marquise de Rothelin

Dame (-d'honneur) to Mary Stuart 1559–1560

Mary Stuart left France for Scotland in 1561, after which almost all of her ladies-in-waiting chose to remain in France. 

 1560 : Jacqueline de Longwy
 1560 : Marie-Catherine Pierrevive
 1560 : Françoise Babou de la Bourdaisière
 1560 : Madeleine de Savoie
 1560 : Antoinette de Bourbon 
 1560 : Louise de Brézé 
 1560 : Anne d'Este 
 1560 : Louise de Rieux, marquise d'Elbeuf
 1560 : Diane de Valois 
 1560 : Françoise de Brézé
 1560 : Marguerite de Lustrac, maréchale de Saint-André
 1560 : Marie de Beaucaire, dame de Martigues
 1560 : Marguerite Bertrand, marquise de Trans
 1560 : Antoinette de Cerisay
 1560 : Marie de Gaignon, dame de Boisy
 1560 : Anne Hurault, dame de Carnavalet
 1560 : Antoinette de La Marck, maréchale de Damville puis duchesse de Montmorency
 1560 : Anne Le Maye, dame de Dannemarie
 1560 : Hillaire de Marconnay, dame de la Berlandière
 1560 : Françoise Robertet, dame de la Bourdaisière
 1560 : Louise d'Halluin, dame de Cipierre

Dame (-d'honneur) to Elisabeth of Austria, Queen of France 1570–1575
 1572-? : Renée de Cossé, dame de Meru
 1572-? : Françoise de Rye, comtesse de Charny
 1572-1573 : Antoinette de La Tour-Landry, duchesse de Rouannois
 1572-1573 : Jacqueline d'Averton, comtesse de Mauleuvrier
 1573-? : Françoise d'Orléans (1549-1601)
 1573-? : Gabrielle de Rochechouart, dame de Lansac
 1573-? : Jeanne de Montmorency, duchesse de Thouars
 ?-1573 : Marie de Montmorency, comtesse de Candalle
 1574-? : Renée de Savoie-Tende
 ?-1574 : Anne de Daillon, dame de Ruffec
 ?-1574 : Marguerite de Bourbon-Vendôme
 ?-1574 : Louise de Brézé
 Renée d'Anjou-Mézière
 Antoinette de Bourbon
 Françoise de Bourbon-Vendôme
 Marie II de Saint-Pol
 Claude Catherine de Clermont
 Henriette de Nevers (1542-1601)
 Catherine de Clèves
 Marie de Clèves (1553-1574)
 Diane de Valois 
 Anne d'Este
 Catherine de Lorraine (1552-1596)
 Alphonsine Strozzi
 Antoinette de La Marck, maréchale de Damville puis duchesse de Montmorency
 Catherine de Silly, dame de Brion
 Diane de Clermont, dame de Monlaur
 Marie de Beaucaire, dame de Martigues
 Hélène Bon, dame de la Tour
 Françoise du Bouchet, maréchale de Cossé
 Anne Chabot, dame de Piennes
 Jeanne Chasteigner, dame de Villeparisis
 Renée de Coesme, dame d'Avangour
 Marguerite de Conan, dame d'Acerac
 Françoise de Cosdun, dame de la Barbelinière
 Charlotte d'Esquetot, maréchale de Brissac
 Louise de Montberon, dame de Sansac
 Françoise Robertet, dame de la Bourdaisière
 Jeanne de Vivonne, dame de Dampierre

Dame (-d'honneur) to Louise of Lorraine 1575–1601

 1575-1590 : Françoise Babou de la Bourdaisière
 1577-? : Catherine de Lorraine, duchesse de Mercœur 
 1577-? : Marie de Luxembourg (1562-1623) 
 1577-? : Marguerite de Conan, dame d'Acerac
 1577-? : Jeanne de Cossé-Brissac, dame de Saint-Luc
 ?-1577 : Diane de Cossé, comtesse de Mansfeld
 ?-1577 : Charlotte Picart d'Esquetot, dame de Brissac
 1578-? : Hélène Bon, dame de la Tour
 1578-? : Françoise de la Baume, dame de Carnevenoy
 1579-? : Isabeau de Sorbières, dame de Saint-Germain
 1579-? : Renée d'Averton, dame de Sérillac
 1579-? : Anne de Daillon, dame d'Estissac
 1579-? : Jacqueline de la Chapelle, dame de Malicorne
 1579-? : Gilberte de Marconnay, dame de Montmorin
 1579-? : Françoise de Rochechouart, dame de Richelieu
 1579-? : Catherine Tournabon, dame d'Elbenne
 1580-? : Sylvie de la Rochefoucault, dame de Champdenier
 1580-? : Antoinette de La Tour, comtesse de Chasteauvillain
 1580-? : Jacqueline d'Aumont, dame d'Allègre
 1580-? : Madeleine de Bouillé, vicomtesse de Rochechouart
 1580-? : Suzanne de la Porte, dame de Richelieu
 1580-1581 : Renée d'Anjou-Mézière
 1580-1587 : Françoise de Laval, dame de Lenoncourt
 1582-? : Marie Gentian, dame de Miron
 1582-? : Jeanne de Lenoncourt, dame de Boisdauphin
 1582-? : Marguerite de Lorraine, duchesse de Joyeuse 
 1582-? : Marie d'Elbeuf, duchesse d'Aumale
 1582-? : Marie de Beaucaire, dame de Martigues
 1582-? : Antoinette de La Marck, maréchale de Damville puis duchesse de Montmorency
 1582-? : Anne de Rostaing, dame de Sourdis
 1582-? : Héliette de Vivonne, dame de Fontaines-Chalandray
 1582-? : Henriette de Savoie-Villars
 1582-1583 : Jeanne de Coesme
 1582-1586 : Diane de Lorraine, duchesse de Piney 
 1583-? : Diane de Valois 
 1583-? : Catherine de Lorraine (1552-1596)
 1584-? : Antoinette de Pons
 1584-? : Catherine du Val, dame de Rothelin
 1584-? : Catherine de la Marche, dame de Champvallon
 1584-? : Claude de L'Aubépine, dame de Chemerault
 1585-? : Claude Catherine de Clermont
 1585-? : Charlotte de Sauve
 1585-? : Marguerite de Dinteville
 1585-? : Charlotte de Beaucaire, dame de Viverots
 1585-? : Anne de Batarnay, dame de la Vallette
 1585-? : Marie d'Allègre, dame de la Fayette
 1585-? : Gabrielle de Crevant, dame de Montigny
 1585-? : Françoise du Plessis, dame du Cambout
 1585-? : Anne Hurault, marquise de Nesle
 1585-1586 : Catherine de Nogaret, dame du Bouchage
 ?-1585 : Anne de Thou, dame de Cheverny
 ?-1586 : Madeleine de Savoie
 1587-? : Christine d'Aguerres, comtesse de Saulx
 1587-? : Claude de Pierres, dame de Marigny
 1588-? : Marguerite Claude de Gondi, marquise de Maignelers
 1588-? : Isabelle de la Rochefoucault, dame de Randan
 1589-? : Jacquette de Montberon, dame de Bourdeilles
 Anne d'Este
 Catherine de Clèves
 Henriette de Nevers (1542-1601)
 Marie II de Saint-Pol
 Françoise d'Orléans (1549-1601)
 Jeanne de Laval (1549-1586)
 Gabrielle de Rochechouart, dame de Lansac
 Catherine de Marcilly, dame de Ragny
 Marie d'Arconna
 Anne Chabot, dame de Piennes
 Jeanne Chastaigner, dame de Schomberg
 Antoinette du Chastellet, dame de la Bastide
 Hélène d'Illiers, dame d'O
 Françoise de La Marck, dame de Villequier
 Françoise Robertet, dame de la Bourdaisière
 Françoise de Rye, comtesse de Charny
 Marguerite de Saluces, maréchale de Bellegarde
 Catherine de Silly, dame de Brion
 Diane de Vivonne, dame de Larchant

Dame (-d'honneur) to Marie de' Medici 1600–1632

 Louise Marguerite of Lorraine
 Charlotte des Essarts
 Charlotte-Marguerite de Montmorency

Dame (-d'honneur) to Anne of Austria 1615–1666

 Louise Marguerite of Lorraine

Dame du Palais to Maria Theresa of Spain 1660–1683 
The Dame (-d'honneur) were renamed Dame du Palais in January 1674.

 Madame la Duchesse d’Uzais
 Louise Antoinette Thérèse de la Châtre, Duchesse la Marêchale de Humiéres
 Françoise-Athénaïs de Rochechouart, Marquise de Montespan
 Marguerite-Louise-Suzanne de Béthune Sully, Madame la Comtesse de Guiche, prêsentement Duchesse du Lude
 Elizabeth, Countess de Gramont in 1667-
 Anne de Rohan-Chabot, Madame la Princesse de Soubize in 1674-
 Marie-Françoise de Villars-Brancas, Madame la Princesse de Harcourt in 1667-1683
 Jeanne Marie Thérèse Colbert, Madame la Duchesse de Chevreuse 
 Marie d'Albret, Madame d’Albret
 Marie Françoise de Bournonville, Madame la Duchesse de Noailles
 Madame la Marquise de la Valiére
 Marie Louise Claire D'Albert de Luynes, Madame la Princesse de Tingry, in 1679-1683
 Jeanne Angélique Rocque (de Varengeville), duchess de Villars
 Henriette Louise Colbert, Madame la Duchesse de Beauvilliers
 Isabelle de Ludres
 Françoise-Madeleine-Claude de Warignies, comtesse de Saint-Géran
 Louise Gabrielle de La Baume Le Blanc, comtesse de Plessis-Praslin puis duchesse de Choiseul
 Louise Boyer, Duchesse de Noailles in 1674-

Dame du Palais to Marie Leszczyńska 1725–1768
Many of the Dame du Palais of Marie Leszczyńska were transferred to the court of Marie Antoinette in 1770 with the title Dame pour accompanger, and became Dame du Palais again when Marie Antoinette became queen in 1774. 

 1725–1740: Marie-Adélaïde de Gramont, duchesse de Biron, dite duchesse de Gontaut
 1725–1728: Henriette-Julie de Durfort, comtesse d’Egmont 
 1725–1740: Marie-Françoise de Rochechouart-Mortemart, princesse de Chalais 
 1725–1737: Julie-Christine-Régine Gorge d’Antraigues, duchesse de Béthune-Charost
 1725–1746: Garcie-Joséphine-Pétronille de Salcedo, comtesse de Mérode
 1725–1741: Edmée-Charlotte de Brenne, marquise de Matignon
 1725–1729: Armande Félice de La Porte Mazarin, marquise de Nesle
 1725–1726: Agnès Berthelot de Pléneuf, marquise de Prie 
 1725–1741: Marie-Marguerite de Tourzel d’Alègre, marquise de Rupelmonde
 1725–1727: Jeanne-Angélique Rocque de Varengeville, duchesse de Villars
 1725–1757: Françoise-Gillette de Montmorency-Luxembourg, duchesse d' Antin
 1725–1729: Marie Isabelle de Rohan, Duchess of Tallard
 1726–1734: Marie-Josèphe de Boufflers, duchesse d'Alincourt
 1727–1742: Amable-Gabrielle de Villars
 1728–1739: Henriette Fitzjames, marquise de Renel
 1729–1757: Catherine-Éléonore-Eugénie de Béthisy de Mézières, princesse de Montauban
 1729–1742: Louise Julie de Mailly
 1734–1749: Madeleine-Angélique de Neufville de Villeroy, duchesse de Boufflers, puis de Luxembourg
 1737–1745: Marthe-Élisabeth de La Rochefoucauld de Roye, duchesse d'Ancis
 1737–1762: Laure Fitz-James, marquise de Bouzols 
 1739–1768: Anne-Madeleine-Françoise d'Auxy de Monceaux Fleury
 1740–1768: Marie-Élisabeth Chamillart, marquise de Talleyrand 
 1741–1751: Marie-Chrétienne-Christine de Gramont, comtesse de Rupelmonde 
 1741–1762: Victoire-Louise-Joseph Goyon de Matignon, duchesse de Fitz-James
 1742–1744: Marie Anne de Mailly  
 1742–1766: Hortense Félicité de Mailly
 1745–1748: Hélène-Françoise-Angélique Phélypeaux de Pontchartrain, duchesse de Nivernais
 1746–1753: Marie-Françoise-Casimire de Froulay de Tessé, comtesse de Saulx
 1747–1768: Marie-Anne-Philippine-Thérèse de Montmorency-Logny, duchesse de Boufflers
 1748–1768: Louise-Félicité de Bréhan de Plélo, duchesse d'Agénois puis d'Aiguillon
 1749–1752: Alise-Tranquille de Clermont-Tonnerre, marquise de Montoison (dame du palais surnuméraire)
 1753–1759: Anne-Marguerite-Gabrielle de Beauvau-Craon, duchesse de Mirepoix
 1751–1768: Marie-Louise-Sophie de Faoucq de Garnetot, comtesse de Gramont
 1756–1764: Madame de Pompadour
 1757–1768: Marie-Anne-Julie Le Tonnelier de Breteuil, comtesse de Clermont-Tonnerre
 1757–1768: Marie-Émilie FitzJames, marquise d'Escars 
 1759–1768: Marie-Éléonore de Lévis de Châteaumorand, comtesse de Tavannes 
 1762–1768: Laure-Auguste de Fitz-James, Princess de Chimay
 1762–1766: Marie-Hélène-Charlotte Caillebot de La Salle, vicomtesse de Beaune
 1763–1768: Marie-Madeleine de Rosset de Fleury, duchesse de Beauvilliers  
 1764–1768: Gabrielle Pauline d'Adhémar
 1766–1768: Marie-Paule-Angélique d'Albert de Luynes, duchesse de Chaulnes
 1767–1768: Louise-Charlotte de Duras (dame du palais surnuméraire)

Dame du Palais to Marie Antoinette 1774–1792
Many of the Dame du Palais of Marie Antoinette were transferred to her from the former court of Marie Leszczyńska in 1770. They had the title Dame pour accompanger when Marie Antoinette was Dauphine, and became Dame du Palais again when Marie Antoinette became queen in 1774. 

 1774–1791: Louise-Charlotte de Duras
 1774–1775: Laure-Auguste de Fitz-James, Princess de Chimay
 1774-1789: Guyonne-Élisabeth-Josèphe de Montmorency-Laval, Duchesse de Luynes
 1774–1788: Guyonne-Marguerite-Philippine-Élisabeth de Durfort, Vicomtesse de Choiseul-Praslin
 1774–1781: Louise-Adélaïde-Victoire de Durfort de Civrac, Marquise de Clermont-Tonnerre
 1774–1789: Madeleine-Suzanne-Adélaïde Voyer d'Argenson de Paulmy, Duchesse de Luxembourg
 1774–1785: Marie-Éléonore de Lévis de Châteaumorand, Comtesse de Tavannes
 1774–1780: Marie-Elisabeth Chamillart, Marquise de Talleyrand
 1774–1788: Marie-Louise-Sophie de Faoucq de Garnetot, Comtesse de Gramont
 1774–1786: Marie-Madeleine de Rosset de Fleury, Duchesse de Beauvilliers
 1774–1781: Marie-Paule-Angélique d'Albert de Luynes, Duchesse de Chaulnes
 1775–1792: Colette-Marie-Paule-Hortense-Bernardine de Beauvilliers de Saint-Aignan, Marquise de La Roche-Aymon
 1778–1789: Gabrielle Pauline d'Adhémar
 1778–1789: Adélaïde-Félicité-Étienette de Guinot de Monconseil, Princesse d'Hénin
 1780–1782: Thérèse-Lucy de Dillon (dame du palais surnuméraire)
 1780–1789: Alexandrine-Victoire-Éléonore de Damas d'Antigay, Comtesse de Talleyrand
 1781–1789: Marie-Sylvie-Claudine de Thiard de Bissy, Duchesse de Fitzjames
 1781–1789: Marie-Thérèse-Josèphe de Castellane, Princesse de Berghes
 1782–1789: Louise de Polastron
 1784–1789: Marie-Louise de Bonnières de Souastre de Guisnes, Comtesse de Juigné
 1785–1789: Gabrielle-Charlotte-Éléonore de Saulx-Tavannes, Vicomtesse de Castellane
 1786–1792: Louise-Emmanuelle de Châtillon, Princesse de Tarente
 1787–1789: Henriette-Lucy, Marquise de La Tour du Pin Gouvernet (dame du palais surnuméraire)
 1788–1789: Gabrielle-Charlotte-Eugénie de Boisgelin, Comtesse de Gramont d'Aster
 1788–1792: Madeleine-Angélique-Charlotte de Bréhan, Duchesse de Maillé

Dame du Palais to Joséphine de Beauharnais 1804–1814

 1804–1809: Jeanne Charlotte du Lucay
 1804–1809: Madame de Rémusat
 1804–1809: Elisabeth Baude de Talhouët
 1804–1809: Madame Lauriston
 1804–1809: Madame d'Arberg
 1804–1809: Marie Antoinette Duchâtel
 1804–1809: Sophie de Segur
 1804–1809: Madame Séran
 1804–1809: Madame Colbert
 1804–1809: Madame Savary
 1804–1809: Aglaé Louise Auguié Ney
 1804–1809: Élisabeth de Vaudey

Dame du Palais to Marie Louise 1810–1814

 1810-1813 : Aglaé Auguié
 1810-1814 : Marie Madeleine Lejéas-Carpentier, duchesse de Bassano
 1810-1814 : Comtesse de Montmorency
 1810-1814 : Madame Mortemart
 1810-1814 : Madame de Bouille
 1810-1814 : Élisabeth Baude de Talhouët
 1810-1814 : Madame Lauriston
 1810-1814 : Marie-Antoinette Duchâtel
 1810-1814 : Madame Peron
 1810-1814 : Madame Lascaris
 1810-1814 : Madame Noailles
 1810-1814 : Madame Ventimiglia
 1810-1814 : Madame Gentili
 1810-1814 : Madame Canisy
 1810–1814: Anna Pieri Brignole Sale
 1810-1814 : Adélaïde de Saint-Germain
 1810-1814 : Dorothée de Courlande

Dame du Palais to Eugénie de Montijo 1853–1870

 1853–1870: Adrienne de Villeneuve-Bargemont
 1853–1870: Anne Eve Mortier de Trévise
 1853–1870: Claire Emilie MacDonnel
 1853–-1870: Jane Thorne
 1853–1864: Louise Poitelon du Tarde
 1853–1870: Nathalie de Ségur
 18??–18??: Mélanie de Pourtalès
 1866–1870: Amélie Carette

See also
 Lady of the Bedchamber, English equivalent
 Statsfru, Swedish equivalent

References

 Mathieu da Vinha & Raphaël Masson: Versailles: Histoire, Dictionnaire et Anthologie
 http://www.chateauversailles-recherche-ressources.fr/jlbweb/jlbWeb

Ancien Régime
Ancien Régime office-holders
Government of France
French monarchy
Court titles in the Ancien Régime
Gendered occupations
French ladies-in-waiting
French royal court